Padma Shri Award, India's fourth highest civilian honours, Winners, 1980-1989:

Recipients

References

External links
 
 

Recipients of the Padma Shri
Lists of Indian award winners
1980s in India
1980s-related lists